The Hickman County Courthouse, in Clinton, Kentucky, was listed on the National Register of Historic Places in 1975.

The building originally had a square tower, which has been lost.

References

External links

County courthouses in Kentucky
Courthouses on the National Register of Historic Places in Kentucky
Government buildings completed in 1884
National Register of Historic Places in Hickman County, Kentucky
1884 establishments in Kentucky